Jan Florian (1921–2007) was a Czech painter.

See also
List of Czech painters

References

1921 births
2007 deaths
20th-century Czech painters
Czech male painters
Czechoslovak painters
20th-century Czech male artists